Edward Anthony Oakden  is a British diplomat, the Ambassador to Jordan from 2015 to 2020.

He was educated at Repton School and Trinity College, Cambridge.

Career
In 1981 he joined the Foreign and Commonwealth Office.
From 1984 to 1985 he was Third Secretary (later Second Secretary) in Baghdad.
From 1985 to 1988 he was Second Secretary British Embassy in Khartoum.
From 1988 to 1992 he was Private Secretary to the Ambassador in Washington, D.C.
From 1992 to 1995 he was Deputy Head of the EU, External & Eastern Adriatic Department in the Foreign and Commonwealth Office.
From 1995 to 1997 he was Private Secretary to John Major for Foreign Affairs, Defence and Northern Ireland. 
From 1997 to 1998 he was Deputy Head EU Department (Internal) in the Foreign and Commonwealth Office.
From 1998 to 2002 he was Deputy Head of Mission in Madrid
From 2002 to 2004 he was Director for International Security in the Foreign and Commonwealth Office.
In 2002 he was head of Security Policy Department in the Foreign and Commonwealth Office.
From 2004 to 2006 he was Director for Defence and Strategic Threats and Ambassador for Counter-Terrorism in the Foreign and Commonwealth Office.
From 2006 to 2010 he was Ambassador in Abu Dhabi (United Arab Emirates).
From 2010 to 2012 he was Managing Director of a Sector Group of UK Trade & Investment.
From 2012 to 2013 he was Managing Director of UK Trade & Investment.
From 2013 to 2015 he was Director of the department Middle East, with responsibility for Persian Gulf countries, Iraq and Iran. in the Foreign and Commonwealth Office.
He was succeeded by Bridget Brind.

Personal life 
He is married to Dr Florence Eid and has three daughters.

References

1959 births
Living people
People educated at Repton School
Alumni of Trinity College, Cambridge
Ambassadors of the United Kingdom to the United Arab Emirates
Ambassadors of the United Kingdom to Jordan
Companions of the Order of St Michael and St George